Des Sources Boulevard is a north-south artery located in the west of the island of Montreal, informally known locally as the West Island.

The boulevard crosses the island completely from north to south. In the south, it starts at the intersection of Chemin du Bord-du-Lac and intersects Highway 20 at Exit 53. It then intersects Highway 40 at Exit 55. Thereafter, it crosses the city of Dollard-des-Ormeaux and reaches Pierrefonds Boulevard and Gouin Boulevard in the north. It ends on Debours Street in a newly built residential area.

History

Des Sources goes back to the 1700s when it facilitated the movement from one concession to the nexthence its former name “montée des Sources”. It was designated a boulevard only in 1961.

Public transport

The 209 Des Sources serves the boulevard starting from YUL Montréal Trudeau airport to Roxboro Pierrfonds REM station. The 409 Express Des Sources goes from Av. Anselme-Lavigne to Du College metro station.

See also

Boulevard Saint-Jean – parallel artery to Boulevard des Sources to the west
Boulevard Saint-Charles – parallel artery to Boulevard des Sources to the west

References

External links

Roads in Montreal
Dollard-des-Ormeaux